Andreas "Ringo" Ringhofer (born 19 December 1970) is an Austrian ski mountaineer, cross-country skier, cyclist and long-distance runner.

Ringhofer was a member of the national ski cross-country skiing squad for twelve years, and has been a member of the national team since the foundation of the ASKIMO. Also healthy restrictions since 2004 he took part in several competitions. 

He is married with one daughter. Professionally he is a police officer and lives in Schladming.

Selected results

Mountain running 
 1987:
 1st, Styrian Championship single
 2002:
 1st, International Feuerkogel mountain run
 2003: 
 1st, Styrian Championship team
 1st, Planneralm mountain run
 3rd, Dolomitenmann

Cross-country skiing 
 several times Styrian champion
 six times Austrian champion
 1990:
 1st, European Cup
 1991: 
 1st, European Cup
 6th, Nordic World Ski Championships 4×10 km relay (together with Alois Schwarz, Alois Stadlober and Alexander Marent)
 1992:
 18th: Winter Olympics 15 km pursuit

Ski mountaineering 
 2000:
 1st and course record, Hochwurzen-Berglauf
 2001:
 1st and course record, Hochwurzen-Berglauf
 2002:
 1st and course record, Hochwurzen-Berglauf
 2nd, Planai X-treme night ski marathon, Planai
 3rd, Wildsaurennen (literally: wild sow race)
 2003:
 1st, Planai X-treme night ski marathon
 1st and course record, Hochwurzen-Berglauf
 1st, Wildsaurennen
 2nd, International Preberlauf
 4th, Dachsteinbock
 8th, Mountain Attack
 2004:
 1st, Mountain Attack
 1st and course record, 1st Ötzi-Alpin-Marathon
 1st, Planai X-treme night ski marathon
 1st and course record, Hochwurzen-Berglauf
 1st, International Dachstein ride
 2nd, Austrian Championship
 2nd, Dachsteinbock
 2nd, Hochsunnlauf
 6th, World Championship vertical race
 9th, World Championship team race (together with Alexander Lugger)
 2005:
 1st, Mountain Attack
 2nd, Austrian Championship
 2006:
 1st, Hochwurzen-Berglauf
 1st and course record, Knappen-Königs-Trophy, Bischofshofen
 1st and course record, Champ Or Cramp
 1st, Ötzi-Alpin-Marathon team 
 2nd, Mountain Attack
 2nd, Pizolada delle Dolomiti, Moena
 2nd, Sellaronda Skimarathon (together with Alois Blassing)
 2nd, Fritschi-Dachstein-Xtreme within the Austrian Championship, Schladming
 2007:
 1st, Sellrain Valley marathon
 1st, Fritschi-Dachstein-Xtreme within the Austrian Championship, Schladming
 3rd, Mountain Attack
 2008:
 1st, Mountain Attack
 1st, Rofan Xtreme team (together with Johann Wieland and Andreas Fischbacher)
 2nd, Rofan Xtreme single within the Austrian Championship
 3rd, Sellaronda Skimarathon (together with Heinz Verbnjak)
 4th, World Championship single race

Marathon 
 2005:
 3rd, LCC Vienna autumn marathon
 2006:
 2nd, Wachau marathon
 5th, Graz marathon

References 

1970 births
Living people
Austrian male ski mountaineers
Olympic cross-country skiers of Austria
Austrian police officers
Austrian male cross-country skiers
Cross-country skiers at the 1992 Winter Olympics